Bgheidid  is a Syrian village located in Al-Saan Subdistrict in Salamiyah District, Hama.  According to the Syria Central Bureau of Statistics (CBS), Bgheidid had a population of 50 in the 2004 census.

References 

Populated places in Salamiyah District